NASP may refer to:
In animation
 Nickelodeon Animated Shorts Program

In science and academia
 Nuclear autoantigenic sperm protein, a gene in the human genome
 National Association of School Psychologists

In military
 National Aerospace Plane, another name for the Rockwell X-30 experimental aircraft
 Naval Air Station Pensacola, a United States Navy base in Florida

In politics and government
 National Application Services Provider

In sports
 National Archery in the Schools Program, an archery program for schools in the United States

In automotive
 Naturally aspirated engine, an internal combustion engine that relies on atmospheric pressure for aspiration

In information technologies
 Nokia Asha Software Platform, a Nokia OS for low-end smartphones based on Smarterphone OS